Douglas Gunnels is an American politician who was a state representative in the Tennessee House of Representatives from 1989 to 2001. A Republican, he served the 21st house district, which encompasses Monroe and Loudon counties. Gunnels was preceded by M.F Stafford of Lenoir City, then succeeded by Russell Johnson of Loudon in 2001.

References

Republican Party members of the Tennessee House of Representatives
Living people
1948 births